Prehistoric Trackways National Monument is a national monument in the Robledo Mountains of Doña Ana County, New Mexico, United States, near the city of Las Cruces. It became the 100th active U.S. national monument when it was designated on March 30, 2009.

Fossils
The Prehistoric Trackways National Monument site includes a major deposit of Paleozoic Era fossilized footprints in fossil mega-trackways of land animals, sea creatures, and insects. These are known as trace fossils or ichnofossils. There are also fossilized plants and petrified wood present, as well as plenty of marine invertebrate fossils including brachiopods, gastropods, cephalopods, bivalves, and echinoderms. Much of the fossilized material originated during the Permian Period and is around 280 million years old.

Some of the animals who may have left tracks in the Robledo Mountains include Dimetrodon, Eryops, Edaphosaurus, and multiple other pelycosaurs. There are at least 13 major trace fossils found at the monument, including Selenichnites (sel-EEN-ick-NIGHT eez) or moon-shaped trace, Kouphichnium (koof-ICK-nee-um) or light trace, Palmichnium (pal-ICK-nee-um) or palm [frond] trace, Octopodichnus (oct-toe-pod-ICK-nuss) or eight-footed trace, Lithographus (lith-oh-GRAFF-us) or rock writing, Tonganoxichnus (tong-a-nox-ICK-nuss) or Tonganoxie [Kansas] trace, Augerinoichnus (aw-gurr-EE-no-ICK-nuss) or Augerino trace, Undichna (und-ICK-nuh) or wave-shaped trace, Serpentichnus (serpent-ICK-nuss) or snake-like trace, Batrachichnus (baa-track ICK-nuss) or frog trace, Dromopus (dro-MOE-puss) or running foot, and Dimetropus (die-MEET-row-puss) or Dimetrodon foot.

The trackways can be difficult for the general public to find, as the monument is largely undeveloped with few facilities yet existing to aid fossil hunters. Many of the slabs pulled out by Jerry MacDonald are housed at the New Mexico Museum of Natural History and Science, although they are not on display at this time. Guided hikes are periodically offered by BLM interpretive staff.

Geology
The monument lies along the western portion of the Rio Grande rift and is within part of the Robledo Mountains. It is made up of Cenozoic alluvium and intrusive rock and Paleozoic (Hueco Formation) sediments. The Hueco Formation is Early Permian strata. Most of the monument is Permian and would have been underwater or along the coast of what was once the Hueco Seaway. The tracks can be found in the red rock of the Robledo Mountains Member of the Hueco Formation.

Flora and fauna
The monument is situated at the northern tip of the Chihuahuan Desert. Some examples of plants within the monument are ocotillo, mesquite, creosote bush, prickly-pear cactus, Torrey yucca, barrel cactus, sotol, agave and snakeweed. A few of the animals that you may see are mule deer, rattlesnakes, desert cottontail, many species of lizards, and several species of birds.

Climate

Discovery
In situ Paleozoic Era tracks were discovered on June 6, 1987 by Jerry Paul MacDonald. Scattered footprints had been found in the Robledos for almost fifty years prior to MacDonald starting his search. He used the recollections of local hikers, quarrymen, and fossil hunters to concentrate his search. This initial site was named the "Discovery Site". It is one of the best places in the monument for visitors to see fossilized tracks. Jerry MacDonald excavated three long trackways, carrying over 2500 slabs out from the site on his back. The majority of the slabs are housed in the New Mexico Museum of Natural History and Science in the Jerry MacDonald Paleozoic Trackways Collection. Two other continuous trackways are held in the Carnegie Museum of Natural History and Smithsonian.

Monument designation
Prehistoric Trackways National Monument was sponsored by Senators Jeff Bingaman (D-NM) and Pete Domenici (R-NM) and was part of the National Landscape Conservation System of the United States of America under the Omnibus Public Land Management Act, signed into law on March 30, 2009. It was the first national monument established under the Barack Obama administration, and the fourth established in 2009. At the time of its establishment, it was the 100th active national monument in the United States (not the 100th national monument ever designated, since some monuments were previously designated and later dissolved, but the 100th national monument still in operation).

Recreation

The Bureau of Land Management is in the process of writing a resource management plan for the monument to be completed in 2012. In the meantime, there are no developed hiking or equestrian trails, and only one interpretive sign. Roads are not maintained and there are no facilities. There are OHV and mountain bike trails, which are rugged and require appropriate skills and equipment.

See also
 List of national monuments of the United States
 Walchia
 Fossil trackways in the United States
 Organ Mountains–Desert Peaks National Monument
 White Sands National Park

References

External links
Official Bureau of Land Management website
 Book in PDF. on monument
 10 podcasts on the monument
 New Mexico Museum of Natural History and Science
 News report on YouTube

National Monuments in New Mexico
Bureau of Land Management National Monuments
Bureau of Land Management areas in New Mexico
Fossil parks in the United States
Fossil trackways in the United States
Paleozoic life
Paleozoic New Mexico
Protected areas of Doña Ana County, New Mexico
2009 establishments in New Mexico
Protected areas established in 2009
National Monuments designated by Barack Obama
Units of the National Landscape Conservation System
Paleontology in New Mexico